Peter Andre (born Peter James Andrea, 27 February 1973) is an English-Australian singer and television personality.

Andre achieved success in the mid-1990s as a singer, topping the UK Singles Chart with "Flava" and "I Feel You" in 1996. After featuring in the third series of I'm a Celebrity...Get Me Out of Here! in 2004, Andre found renewed popularity and his 1995 hit "Mysterious Girl" reached number one upon a reissue. He has continued his career in music and television, notably competing in the thirteenth series of Strictly Come Dancing (2015) and starring in the Katie & Peter TV franchise (2004–2009) with his former wife Katie Price, whom he met when both appeared in I'm a Celebrity.

Early life and music career
Andre was born on 27 February 1973 in Harrow, London, to Greek Cypriot parents. In 1979, as a six-year-old, Andre and his family relocated to Sydney, before settling on Australia's Gold Coast when he was nine. At the age of 14, Andre finished runner-up to Wade Robson in a dancing competition where the prize was to meet Michael Jackson.

In 1989, 16-year-old Andre became a contestant on Australian talent show New Faces, and as a result, he was offered a recording contract for $146,000. During this time, Andre lived in a beach-side apartment in Surfers Paradise and attended Benowa State High School on the Gold Coast.

Andre was sent to the UK to work with producers Phil Harding and Ian Curnow at PWL Studios, where he recorded his debut single "Drive Me Crazy", and his breakthrough hit, "Gimme Little Sign". "He was brilliant," recalled Curnow of the sessions, while Harding remembered, "he was extremely enthusiastic and quite hard to control — but he was a good singer."

In 1992, Andre released "Drive Me Crazy", which peaked at No. 72 on the Australian singles chart. However, his musical breakthrough occurred with his second single, "Gimme Little Sign", which peaked at No. 3 and spent a total of 31 weeks in the charts. In 1993, Andre received an ARIA Award for highest-selling Australian single of the year. His second studio album was released on 30 September 1996, peaking at No. 1 in the UK Albums Chart. The album included the hit single "Mysterious Girl", which peaked at number 2 on the UK Singles Chart in 1996, but reached number 1 on re-release in 2004, following Andre's appearance in I'm a Celebrity...Get Me Out of Here! As a result, Andre returned to the UK in the mid-1990s.

On 14 September 2009, Peter released his sixth studio album, Revelation. Notable tracks "Behind Closed Doors" and "Unconditional" peaked at 4th and 50th respectively in the UK charts, with the album reaching No. 3.

Andre was raised as a Jehovah's Witness, but is now lapsed.

Television
During their marriage, Andre and Katie Price launched the Katie & Peter franchise on ITV2, which documented their life together. The franchise included several fly-on-the-wall reality series which comprised When Jordan Met Peter, Jordan & Peter: Laid Bare and Jordan & Peter: Marriage and Mayhem (2004–05); Katie & Peter: The Next Chapter, Katie & Peter: The Baby Diaries and Katie & Peter: Unleashed (2007); Katie & Peter: Down Under; and Katie & Peter: African Adventures (2008); and Katie & Peter: Stateside in 2009. Their 2009 separation resulted in their individual series being recorded: Peter Andre: The Next Chapter continued on ITV2 until 2011, followed by Peter Andre: Here 2 Help (2011) and Peter Andre: My Life (2011–13).

In July 2010, Andre and Jason Manford were team captains on the ITV series Odd One In. In 2013, Andre was a guest judge on the ITV entertainment series Your Face Sounds Familiar, and later guest-presented five editions of Sunday Scoop on ITV. Since 11 November that year, Andre has presented 60 Minute Makeover, which has been re-branded as Peter Andre's 60 Minute Makeover.

In 2014, Andre released the song "Kid" (for the film Mr. Peabody & Sherman) which was the lead single from his album Big Night. On 8 October that same year, Andre co-hosted the ITVBe opener with Jamelia. In 2014, Andre became the new face to feature in supermarket Iceland's television commercials.

Andre has since starred in the ITV weekly series Give a Pet a Home which works alongside the RSPCA in Birmingham.
In August 2015, he was announced as a contestant for the thirteenth series of Strictly Come Dancing which began a month later and in which he was partnered with Janette Manrara. They went out just before the quarter final, in week 10, and therefore finished in seventh place.

In 2018, Andre voiced Ace the race car in the Thomas & Friends production Big World! Big Adventures and in the show 24th season in 2020.

Personal life

Andre began dating glamour model Katie Price after they met on reality series I'm a Celebrity...Get Me Out of Here! in early 2004. The couple got engaged secretly that May, but it was not announced publicly until months later. They married on 10 September 2005 in Highclere Castle, Hampshire. They have two children together: son Junior Savva, born on 13 June 2005; and daughter Princess Tiaamii Crystal Esther, born on 29 June 2007. While married to Price, Andre was stepfather to her son Harvey, from her earlier relationship with football player Dwight Yorke. The couple renewed their vows in September 2008. But in May 2009, it was announced that Andre and Price had separated after three-and-a-half years of marriage. They were officially divorced in September of that year.

In July 2012, Peter Andre began a relationship with Dr Emily MacDonagh (born c. 1989) who gave birth to Andre's third child, a daughter, Amelia on 7 January 2014. Andre and Emily married on 11 July 2015 near Exeter at Mamhead House. On 22 November 2016, they had a son, Theodore James. In summer 2022, MacDonagh was painted silver to promote awareness of iron deficiency in women, which affects 14% after giving birth and around four in ten females generally.

Discography

 Peter Andre (1993)
 Natural (1996)
 Time (1997)
 The Long Road Back (2004)
 A Whole New World (with Katie Price) (2006)
 Revelation (2009)
 Unconditional: Love Songs (2010)
 Accelerate (2010)
 Angels & Demons (2012)
 Big Night (2014)
 White Christmas (2014)
 Come Fly with Me (2015)

Filmography

Television
I'm a Celebrity...Get Me Out of Here! (2004, 2011) – Contestant; 3rd place 
When Jordan Met Peter (2004) – himself
Jordan & Peter: Laid Bare (2005) – himself
Jordan & Peter: Marriage and Mayhem (2005) – himself
Katie & Peter: The Next Chapter (2007–08) – himself
Katie & Peter: The Baby Diaries (2007) – himself
Katie & Peter: Unleashed (2007) – co-presenter
Katie & Peter: Down Under (2008) – himself 
Katie & Peter: African Adventures (2008) – himself
Katie & Peter: Stateside (2009) – himself 
Peter Andre: Going It Alone (2009) – himself
The Big Fat Quiz of the Year (2009) - himself
Peter Andre: The Next Chapter (2009–11) – himself
Odd One In (2010–2011) – Team Captain / regular panellist
Peter Andre: Here 2 Help (2011) – himself
Peter Andre: My Life (2011–13) – himself
Peter Andre's Bad Boyfriend Club (2012) – himself
Celebrity Deal or No Deal (2012) - Contestant, won £1,000
Your Face Sounds Familiar (2013) – Guest Judge
Sunday Scoop (2013) – co-presenter
Peter Andre's 60 Minute Makeover (2013–14, 2018–) – Presenter
ITVBe launch show (2014) – co-presenter
Big Star's Little Star (2015) – Contestant
Give a Pet a Home (2015) – celebrity contributor
Strictly Come Dancing (2015) – Contestant; 7th place 
Loose Women (2016) – guest panellist
David Brent: Life on the Road – himself
Thomas and Friends: Big World, Big Adventures! – Ace (voice)

Andre also appeared on Through the Keyhole.

Film 
 David Brent: Life on the Road (2016) - Himself
 The Inheritance (2019) – Harry

Theatre 

 Grease (2019) – Teen Angel
(2022) - Vince Fontain

Awards and nominations

ARIA Music Awards
The ARIA Music Awards is an annual awards ceremony that recognises excellence, innovation, and achievement across all genres of Australian music. They commenced in 1987. Andre has won three awards.

! 
|-
| rowspan="4"|1994
|  "Gimme a Little Sign"
| ARIA Award for Highest Selling Single
| 
| rowspan="4"|
|-
| rowspan="2"| Peter Andre
| ARIA Award for Best Pop Release
| 
|-
| ARIA Award for Breakthrough Artist - Album
| 
|-
| Mark Forrester for Peter Andre – "Funky Junky" and  "Let's Get it On"
| ARIA Award for Engineer of the Year
| 
|-
|1996
| "Mysterious Girl"
| ARIA Award for Highest Selling Single
| 
| 
|-
|1997
| Peter Andre
| ARIA Award for Outstanding Achievement
| 
| 
|}

World Music Awards

!Ref.
|-
| 1997
| Peter Andre
| World's Best Selling Australian Artist
| 
|

References

External links

 
1973 births
ARIA Award winners
English people of Greek Cypriot descent
English businesspeople
English male singer-songwriters
English television personalities
English expatriates in Australia
Former Jehovah's Witnesses
Musicians from Gold Coast, Queensland
People from Harrow, London
Singers from London
Writers from London
Male actors from London
Living people
I'm a Celebrity...Get Me Out of Here! (British TV series) participants
East West Records artists
Mushroom Records artists
Sony BMG artists
Warner Records artists